The 2012 NRL season was the 105th season of professional rugby league club competition in Australia, and the first run by the newly formed Australian Rugby League Commission. The main competition, called the 2012 NRL Telstra Premiership due to sponsorship from Telstra Corporation was contested by the sixteen teams of the National Rugby League. The season started with the 2012 NRL All Stars match and culminated in the 2012 NRL grand final. The 2012 Toyota Cup season also took place alongside the Premiership. The McIntyre final eight system, in use since 1999, was replaced with the finals system previously used by the ARL in the 1990s.

The 2012 Premiership was won by the Melbourne Storm, officially the club's second following the removal of their 2007 and 2009 premierships, among other titles, due to salary cap breaches exposed in April 2010. They defeated minor premiers the Canterbury-Bankstown Bulldogs 14-4 in the Grand Final, which was held on Sunday 30 September at ANZ Stadium in Sydney.

Season summary

Halfway through the 2012 season, the NRL's Chief Executive Officer David Gallop stood down from his role after just over a decade in the role.

Records Set on 2012
 The Canterbury-Bankstown Bulldogs won twelve consecutive matches between Rounds 11 and 24, the longest winning streak for the club in 8 years. They also won their first minor premiership in 18 years. 
 The Melbourne Storm lost five consecutive matches from rounds 16 to 21 (around a bye in round 17), the longest losing streak in Craig Bellamy's coaching career and the second longest losing streak in the club's history.
 For the first time since 1989, the South Sydney Rabbitohs finished in the top four, and they also won their first finals match since 1987.

Teams

Ladder

Finals series 
For details on the finals see 2012 NRL season results.

The NRL returned to the top-eight system used by the ARL in the 1990s to decide the grand finalists from the top eight finishing teams. This replaced the McIntyre final eight system that was used for the past 12 seasons. Only four of last year's finalists were featured in this year's finals series: Melbourne Storm, Manly-Warringah Sea Eagles, Brisbane Broncos and the North Queensland Cowboys. For the teams that did not feature last year, the Canberra Raiders last appeared in 2010, the Canterbury-Bankstown Bulldogs in 2009, the Cronulla-Sutherland Sharks in 2008 and South Sydney in 2007.  South Sydney made only their second finals appearance since 1989 and also their second preliminary final since winning the premiership in 1971.  The last time the club made the preliminary final was also in 1989.

Chart

Grand final

Regular season player statistics
The following statistics are correct as of the conclusion of Round 26.

Top 5 point scorers

Top 5 try scorers

Top 5 goal scorers

Attendance figures

Home ground figures

2012 Transfers

Players

Coaches

See also
2012 NRL season results
2012 NRL Under-20s season

References

External links
 NRL.com – Official site of the NRL, National Rugby League
 NRL final eight Calculator, footy.com.au